A.K.M. Ashraf is an Indian Union Muslim League politician from Kerala. He represents Manjeshwar (State Assembly constituency) in 15th Kerala State Legislative Assembly. He is a graduate in Kannada from Kannur University.

Political career
A. K. M. Ashraf had been Manjeshwar block panchayat member in December 2015.

2021 Assembly Election

References 

Indian Union Muslim League politicians
Kerala MLAs 2021–2026
Living people
1978 births